Heathwick is an informal name for a 2011 proposal to create a high-speed rail link between London's Heathrow and Gatwick airports, in effect to combine them into a single airport. Proponents argue this would balance their capacity and so reduce the need to add more runways to Heathrow, or more airports in the south-east of England. In 2018 the similar project HS4Air was proposed.

History
A similar plan was first mooted in the 1990s, then by the British Chambers of Commerce in 2009. Consideration of it by the UK government began in October 2011, when it was dubbed 'Heathwick' by the UK press.

Proposals
It is hoped that this streamlined immigration/check-in procedure would enable passengers arriving at one airport and departing on a connecting flight from the other to complete the transfer process within 75 minutes, thereby increasing its attractiveness as a viable alternative to changing flights at an overseas hub airport.

To make a combined Heathwick hub work, Gatwick would assume the role of a short- and medium-haul feeder for Heathrow's long-haul flights. The scheme's success rests on the assumption that a high-speed Gatwick–Heathrow rail link would increase the value of the former's takeoff and landing slots to a point where it will be attractive for low/no frills airlines that presently account for more than half of its traffic to sell these to full-service rivals and move their operations to other London airports Stansted, Luton or Southend. This would ensure that Gatwick has sufficient room to accommodate the large number of short-/medium-haul flights needed to feed Heathrow's long-haul services, given that it is already running at 80% capacity. Gatwick would also be required to build a second runway to cope with the huge influx of new short and medium haul flights moving in from Heathrow and to create an effective four runway hub with Heathrow.

Proponents of Heathwick argue that at an estimated cost of £5 billion it is a viable alternative to the politically fraught provision of additional runway capacity at existing airports in the Southeast of England and much cheaper and less time-consuming than building a new hub airport in the Thames Estuary.

In 2013 a group called Interlinking Transit Solutions Ltd submitted proposals to the House of Commons Transport Select Committee which outlined a privately financed rapid transit system named  London Air Rail Transit system (LARTs). This orbital light rail system would follow the M25 route on an elevated guideway from Luton Airport in the north, around to Heathrow and terminating at Gatwick. Further extensions as far as Stansted Airport are also envisaged. Special light rail rolling stock would be designed to carry baggage, cargo and mail.

Industry reaction
The aviation and rail industry's initial response has been overwhelmingly negative: British Airways said it would not address the South-East's looming airport capacity crunch, which it said must be alleviated to maintain the UK's global competitiveness. EasyJet vowed to fight a forcible move from Gatwick. Ryanair CEO Michael O'Leary doubted the feasibility of the Heathwick high-speed rail link in the foreseeable future due to its high cost. BAA and an unnamed rail executive questioned the project's success on grounds of technical, operational, political and financial difficulties as well as long time scales.

Present alternatives 

To travel between London airports the main options are (which can equally work in reverse):

Elizabeth line trains run from all Heathrow Airport terminal stations into central London.
Heathrow to Gatwick
 Heathrow Express trains go only to Paddington station. From there, passengers can use bus, taxi or London Underground (District or Circle Lines) to transfer to Victoria station. Gatwick Express trains go from Victoria to Gatwick Airport. A two-hour journey is standard.
A time of 1 hours 40 minutes is typical from Terminal 4; or as much as 3 hours from the other terminals during heaviest traffic, worse timings and if slow trains are boarded (usually required during the early-morning, weekday peak).
North-south
 A shuttle bus from Luton Airport serves ; from there, Thameslink trains run directly to Gatwick Airport. Around two hours travel is typical.
All London airports
 Coaches take typically 60 to 90 minutes, plus waiting time (up to 15 minutes peak hour and up to 1 hour off-peak)
 Taxis take around 45 minutes (Heathrow-Gatwick) if in little traffic and 80 minutes (north-south), however, more than double that in heavy traffic.
All options require going through immigration, baggage delivery, a customs channel, and later to check-in and security check pre-flight, which adds to these times. Hand-luggage-only passengers bypass baggage delivery. Passengers should seek to purchase at their first-leg airport an auto-checked, fully issued ticket/e-ticket boarding pass to bypass the first stage of connection flight check-in(s).

Future connections
The forthcoming Luton DART (Direct Air-Rail Transit) will link Luton Airport directly to Luton Airport Parkway railway station.

See also
 Heathrow Airport transport proposals
 Superlink (railway network)
 Windsor Link Railway
 Airlink (helicopter shuttle service), which linked the airports between 1978 and 1986

References

Proposed railway lines in England
High-speed rail in the United Kingdom
Heathrow Airport transport proposals
Gatwick Airport